Water Oakley is a hamlet on the River Thames in the civil parish of Bray in the county of Berkshire, England. It is the location of both Bray Studios and the Oakley Court Hotel.

History
It first appeared on maps around 1800. However, the name 'Oakley' is derived from the Old English ac-leah which translates as 'a clearing in an oak wood'. Local folklore suggests a Saxon church there was demolished around 1293 to build St Michael's Church in Bray.

Geography
Water Oakley has a site of Special Scientific Interest (SSSI) just to the north of the village, called Bray Pennyroyal Field.

References

External links

Royal Berkshire History: Water Oakley

Hamlets in Berkshire
Bray, Berkshire